Jules Van Cleemput (born 11 April 1997) is a Belgian football player who plays as centre back for Belgian First Division A club Charleroi.

Club career

Mechelen
In 2015, Van Cleemput was called up for Mechelen first team. He had ridden the pine in the two games in 2015, but he didn't play any games in the first team.

Heist (loan)
On 4 January 2016, Van Cleemput was loaned to Heist in Belgian Second Division for six months. On 17 January 2016, Van Cleemput made his Belgian Second Division debut against Deinze at Burgemeester Van de Wiele Stadion, playing the game as a starter for full-time game. In the game, he was shown a yellow card. On 20 February 2016, Van Cleemput scored his first league goal against ASV Geel at 68th minute. In 2015–16 season, Van Cleemput played twelve games and scored a goal and he was shown six yellow card and even a red card once. In the season Heist relegated to the 2016–17 Belgian First Amateur Division.

Return from loan spell
As the loan term was expired, Van Cleemput returned to Mechelen on 1 July 2016. On 2 December 2016, Van Cleemput made his Belgian First Division A debut against K.A.S. Eupen at AFAS-stadion Achter de Kazerne, replacing Xavier Chen at the 38th minute.

International career
Van Cleemput was a member of Belgium national under-19 football team in the 2016 UEFA European Under-19 Championship qualification.

Club career statistics

References

External links

1997 births
Living people
Belgian footballers
Belgium youth international footballers
Belgian Pro League players
Challenger Pro League players
K.V. Mechelen players
K.S.K. Heist players
R. Charleroi S.C. players
Association football defenders